Carl Christian Barker Jørgensen (11 August 1915 – 12 October 2007) was a Danish zoologist.

He was hired at the University of Copenhagen in 1945, and finished his doctoral thesis The Amphibian Water Economy with Special Regard to the Effect of Neurohypophysical Extracts in 1950. From 1965 he was a professor of zoophysiology at the same university.

He was a fellow of the Royal Danish Academy of Sciences and Letters from 1965 and the Norwegian Academy of Science and Letters from 1968, and received the Thunberg Medal in 1970.

References

1915 births
2007 deaths
Danish zoologists
Royal Danish Academy of Sciences and Letters
Members of the Norwegian Academy of Science and Letters